Follow the Sun may refer to:

 Follow-the-sun, in software development
 Follow the Sun (film), a 1951 biographical film
 Follow the Sun (TV series), a 1961–62 American TV series
 Follow the Sun (Evermore album), 2012
 Follow the Sun (Kahil El'Zabar album), 2013
"Follow the Sun", a 1981 song by Siouxsie and the Banshees, the B-side of "Spellbound"
"Follow the Sun", a song by Catharsis from Imago
 Follow the Sun, a 2012 album by Xavier Rudd
 Follow the Sun, a 2017 compilation album of Australian music released by Mexican Summer
 "Follow the Sun", the motto of the 2028 Summer Olympics

See also
 "Follow the Son", a 1994 episode of Roseanne
 "I'll Follow the Sun", a 1964 song by the Beatles
 "I'll Follow the Sun" (Mr. President song), 1995
 "Keep Searchin' (We'll Follow the Sun)", a 1964 song by Del Shannon